Antoine Crespo Travesset (born 15 November 1955) is an Andorran alpine skier. He competed in three events at the 1976 Winter Olympics.

Notes

References

External links
 
 

1955 births
Living people
Andorran male alpine skiers
Olympic alpine skiers of Andorra
Alpine skiers at the 1976 Winter Olympics
Place of birth missing (living people)